John William Kraus (April 26, 1918 – January 2, 1976) was an American professional baseball pitcher who appeared in Major League Baseball in 70 games for the Philadelphia Phillies (1943 and 1945) and New York Giants (1946). In 1944, Kraus served in the United States Army during World War II.

His pro career extended for 14 seasons (1936–1943 and 1945–1950). His rookie season in the majors, 1943, was his finest; he posted a losing, 9–15 won–lost record for a Philadelphia team that finished at 64–90, but he compiled a solid 3.16 earned run average in 199 innings pitched. He threw ten complete games in 25 starts, including a shutout, and was credited with two saves—the only complete games, shutouts and saves of his MLB career. When he returned to the Phils from the Army in 1945 he was much less effective, dropping nine of 13 decisions and putting up a mediocre 5.40 ERA. The following year, as a Giant, he was almost exclusively a relief pitcher; appearing in 17 games, he won two and lost one, but his ERA continued to climb, to 6.12. He returned to the minor leagues for the rest of his pro career.

In his 70 games pitched, 39 started, he lost 15 of 40 decisions and posted an ERA of 4.00. In 306 innings pitched, he allowed 318 hits, 133 bases on balls, and 136 earned runs; he fanned 83.  He died in San Antonio, aged 57, on January 2, 1976.

References

External links

1918 births
1976 deaths
Baseball players from San Antonio
Durham Bulls players
Gainesville G-Men players
Helena Seaporters players
Jackson Senators players
Jersey City Giants players
Los Angeles Angels (minor league) players
Macon Peaches players
Major League Baseball pitchers
Minneapolis Millers (baseball) players
Monessen Indians players
Montgomery Rebels players
Montreal Royals players
New York Giants (NL) players
Opelousas Indians players
Philadelphia Phillies players
San Diego Padres (minor league) players
Shreveport Sports players
United States Army personnel of World War II
Wilkes-Barre Barons (baseball) players
Zanesville Greys players